Argyresthia semifusca is a moth of the family Yponomeutidae. It is found in Europe.

The wingspan is about 12 mm. The head is white. Forewings are dark purplish-bronzy-fuscous; a thick white dorsal streak to tornus, interrupted by a median spot of ground-colour ; costa marked with minute white dashes, posteriorly with three or four white strigulae. Hindwings are  grey.

Adults are on the wing from June to September depending on the location.

The larvae feed on Crataegus and Sorbus aucuparia.

References

External links
UKmoths
Swedish Moths

Argyresthia
Moths described in 1828
Moths of Europe